Corrado Mazzoni was an Italian Lieutenant of World War I. He was an officer within the 67th Infantry Regiment and took part in the Tenth Battle of the Isonzo and the Eleventh Battle of the Isonzo before succumbing to wounds during a siege at Veliki Hrib. He was a posthumous recipient of the Gold Medal of Military Valor for his service during the war.

Biography
Corrado was born in Bologna on May 12, 1892 as the son of Carlo and Emilia Melloni. He attended the "Galvani" High School and then enrolled in the veterinary medicine faculty of the University of Bologna.

On 1914, he was called to lend military service in the Royal Italian Army, being enlisted and assigned to the infantry arm of the 35th Infantry Regiment. He attended the course for cadet officers, obtaining the grades of second lieutenant in November and was transferred to the 67th Infantry Regiment of the "Palermo" Brigade stationed in Como.

On May 24, 1915 , with the Italian entry into World War I, he followed his own unit to the front, first in the sector of the Upper Camonica Valley, and then in that of the Isonzo River. In August 1916, he was promoted to lieutenant on active permanent duty for war merit. In the spring of 1917, the 67th Infantry Regiment was operating in the sector of Monte Santo di Gorizia. On May 23, during the Tenth Battle of the Isonzo, due to the excellent service performed during a dangerous assault against Monte Santo, Mazzoni obtained a Solemn Commendation. On August 17, at the start of the offensive that will give rise to the Eleventh Battle of the Isonzo, the 67th Infantry Regiment was sent to the Sella di Dol area, with the aim of attacking the stronghold of Veliki Hrib.

On August 29, under the command of the 2nd Company of the 1st Battalion, he launched an assault on the hill known as Quota 526, managing to conquer a stretch of trench. Despite being wounded and surrounded by enemy reinforcements, he managed to evade capture. The following day, after refusing to abandon his post to receive adequate treatment following a fresh wound in his leg, he again launched the assault on Veliki Hrib. During the charge, he was reported saying Viva l'Italia, viva il 67°!!, ("Long live Italy, Long Live the 67th!") Arriving on the enemy trench after a dense launch of hand grenades however, he was hit by two rifle bullets in the abdomen. Mazzoni was carried to the rescue station where he died a short time later.

Initially buried in the war cemetery of Vallensa, in 1922 his remains were reinterred to the Certosa di Bologna. With a Lieutenant Decree of 13 June 1918, he was posthumously awarded the Gold Medal of Military Valor, and on January 9 of the same year, the University of Bologna had awarded him an posthumous honorary degree in veterinary medicine.

Legacy
In his home city of Bologna, the Corrado Mazzoni Carabinieri barracks, Via Corrado Mazzoni and the nursery school "Corrado Mazzoni" are all named after him in his honor. In Como, at the De Cristoforis barracks, where the 67th Infantry Regiment was based, there is a commemorative plaque dedicated to him.

Wartime citations

References

Bibliography
Albo d'Oro dei Decorati della provincia di Bologna, Federation of Bologna.

1892 births
1917 deaths
Italian Army officers
Italian military personnel of World War I
Italian military personnel killed in World War I
Military personnel from Bologna
Recipients of the Gold Medal of Military Valor
University of Bologna alumni